LX7 may refer to:
Panasonic Lumix DMC-LX7, a digital camera
RDD Enterprises LX7, a homebuilt aircraft